Cnemaspis gracilis, also known as the slender day gecko or graceful day gecko, is a species of gecko endemic to southern India.

References

Cnemaspis
Reptiles described in 1870